Antwan Deandre Applewhite (born December 31, 1985) is a former American football defensive end who played in the National Football League (NFL). He was signed by the San Diego Chargers as an undrafted free agent in 2007. He played college football at San Diego State.

He was also a member of the San Francisco 49ers, Carolina Panthers, and Miami Dolphins.

Early years
He was an All-area defensive player at Narbonne High School.

Professional career

San Diego Chargers
Applewhite was signed as an undrafted free agent on April 30, 2007 by the National Football League's San Diego Chargers. He was released on September 1, 2007. He was re-signed to the practice squad on November 21.

Applewhite was waived during final cuts in 2008 but was re-signed to the team's practice squad. One game into the season on September 9, he was signed to the active roster after linebacker Shawne Merriman was placed on injured reserve.

San Francisco 49ers
On July 31, 2011, Applewhite signed with the San Francisco 49ers. He was released on September 6.

Carolina Panthers
The Carolina Panthers signed him on October 5, 2011. They converted him from Defensive End to rush Linebacker in mainly 3-4 sets. Then the dropped him only to sign him the next day.

Miami Dolphins
On August 15, 2013, Applewhite was signed by the Miami Dolphins. Miami released him on August 31, prior to the start of the regular season.

References

External links
San Diego State Aztecs bio
San Diego Chargers bio

1985 births
Living people
Players of American football from Los Angeles
American football defensive ends
American football linebackers
San Diego State Aztecs football players
San Diego Chargers players
San Francisco 49ers players
Carolina Panthers players
Miami Dolphins players
Narbonne High School alumni